Cat Ballou is a 1965 American western comedy film starring Jane Fonda and Lee Marvin, who won an Academy Award for Best Actor for his dual role. The story involves a woman who hires a notorious gunman to protect her father's ranch, and later to avenge his murder, only to find that the gunman is not what she expected. The supporting cast features Tom Nardini, Michael Callan, Dwayne Hickman, and Nat King Cole and Stubby Kaye, who together perform the film's theme song, and who appear throughout the film in the form of travelling minstrels or troubadours as a kind of musical Greek chorus and framing device.

The film was directed by Elliot Silverstein from a screenplay by Walter Newman and Frank Pierson adapted from the 1956 novel The Ballad of Cat Ballou by Roy Chanslor, who also wrote the novel filmed as Johnny Guitar. Chanslor's novel was a serious Western, and though it was turned into a comedy for the film, the filmmakers retained some darker elements. The film references many classic Western films, notably Shane. The film was selected by the American Film Institute as the 10th greatest Western of all time in its AFI's 10 Top 10 list in 2008.

Plot
Catherine "Cat" Ballou, a notorious outlaw, is set to be executed in the small town of Wolf City, Wyoming. Two banjo and guitar playing "Shouters", Professor Sam the Shade and the Sunrise Kid, sing the ballad of Cat Ballou and regale the audience with the tale of how she began her career of crime.

Some months prior, Catherine, then an aspiring schoolteacher, is returning home by train to Wolf City from finishing school. On the way, she unwittingly helps accused cattle rustler Clay Boone elude his captor, Sheriff Maledon, when Boone's Uncle Jed, disguised as a preacher, distracts the lawman.

Arriving home at her father (Frankie Ballou)'s ranch, Catherine learns that the Wolf City Development Corporation is scheming to take his ranch. Frankie's sole defender is his ranch hand, educated Native American, Jackson Two-Bears. Clay and Jed appear and reluctantly offer to help Catherine. She hires legendary gunfighter Kid Shelleen to help protect her father from gunslinger Tim Strawn, the tin-nosed hired killer who is threatening him.

Shelleen arrives and proves to be a drunken bum who is a crack shot only when he is inebriated. His presence proves to be useless as Strawn abruptly kills Frankie. When the townspeople refuse to bring Strawn to justice, Catherine becomes a revenge-seeking outlaw known as Cat Ballou. She and her gang rob a train carrying the Wolf City payroll, then take refuge in the desperado hideout "Hole-in-the-Wall". Shelleen is shocked to discover the legendary outlaw Cassidy is now a humble saloonkeeper in Hole-in-the-Wall. 

The gang is thrown out when it is learned what they have done, due to Hole-in-the-Wall's continued existence being dependent on the sufferance of Wolf City. Strawn arrives and threatens Cat. Shelleen, motivated by his affection for Cat, works himself into shape. Dressed up in his finest gunfighter outfit, he goes into town and kills Strawn, then reveals he is Strawn's brother.

Cat poses as a prostitute and confronts Sir Harry Percival, the head of the Wolf City Development Corporation. She attempts to force him into confessing that he ordered her father's murder. A struggle ensues and Sir Harry is killed. Cat is then sentenced to be hanged. With Sir Harry dead,  Wolf City's future is hopeless, and the townspeople have no mercy for Cat. As the noose is placed around her neck, Uncle Jed, again disguised as a preacher, appears and cuts the rope just as the trapdoor opens. Cat safely falls through and onto a wagon. Her gang spirits her away in a daring rescue.

Cast

Jane Fonda as Catherine "Cat" Ballou
Lee Marvin as Kid Shelleen / Tim Strawn
Michael Callan as Clay Boone
Dwayne Hickman as Uncle Jed
Nat King Cole as Shouter – Sunrise Kid
Stubby Kaye as Shouter – Sam the Shade
Tom Nardini as Jackson Two-Bears
John Marley as Frankie Ballou
Reginald Denny as Sir Harry Percival
Jay C. Flippen as Sheriff Cardigan
Arthur Hunnicutt as Butch Cassidy
Bruce Cabot as Sheriff Maledon
Burt Mustin as Accuser
Paul Gilbert as Train Messenger
Frank DeVol as Undertaker
Dorothy Claire as Singer in Brothel (accompanied by Nat King Cole at piano)

Cast notes
Cole and Kaye, billed simply as "Shouters", act as a Greek chorus, intermittently appearing onscreen to narrate the story through ongoing verses of "The Ballad of Cat Ballou", one of the songs written by Mack David and Jerry Livingston for the film.

Production
The film was director Elliot Silverstein's second feature film, with the pressure of filming leading to some quarrels with the producer Harold Hecht, although the film was ultimately a box office success.

Ann-Margret was the first choice for the title role, but her manager turned it down without letting the actress know. Ann-Margret wrote in her autobiography that she would have taken the part. Among others, Kirk Douglas allegedly turned down the role of Shelleen. Years later, he played a similar double role in The Man from Snowy River.

Nat King Cole was ill with lung cancer during the filming of Cat Ballou. A chain smoker, Cole died four months before the film was released.

Jay C. Flippen suffered a circulatory failure during filming and, as a result, later had his leg amputated due to gangrene.

Reception
The film was well received by critics. It earned over $20.6 million in North America, making it the 7th highest-grossing film of 1965.

Bosley Crowther of The New York Times called it "a breezy little film" which "does have flashes of good satiric wit. But, under Elliott Silverstein's direction, it is mostly just juvenile lampoon." Variety wrote that the film "emerges middlingly successful, sparked by an amusing way-out approach and some sparkling performances." Richard L. Coe of The Washington Post praised the film as a "springy satire", adding, "What makes this fun is the style. Forming a mighty cool duo, Nat King Cole and Stubby Kaye sing their way in and out of the plot with folk songs which Cole 'Don't Fence Me In' Porter would have relished. The format is novel and stylishly delivered." Pauline Kael in Film Quarterly called it "lumpen, coy, and obvious, a self-consciously cute movie," adding that "mainly it is full of sort-of-funny and trying-to-be-funny ideas and a movie is not just ideas." Philip K. Scheuer of the Los Angeles Times wrote, "I'm in the minority, apparently. Cat Ballou, which is being hailed as a cowboy Tom Jones or something of the sort, seems to me about as funny as a soundtrack burp." The Monthly Film Bulletin wrote, "The jokes in Cat Ballou are uneven, but the mood behind the film is happily consistent."

The film holds a score of 90% on Rotten Tomatoes based on 29 reviews, with an average grade of 7.4 out of 10.

Awards and nominations

In his Oscar acceptance speech, Lee Marvin concluded by saying, "I think, though, that half of this belongs to a horse somewhere out in San Fernando Valley," a reference to the horse Kid Shelleen rode, which appeared to be as drunk as Shelleen was.

American Film Institute
 1998: AFI's 100 Years...100 Movies – Nominated
 2000: AFI's 100 Years...100 Laughs – #50
 2003: AFI's 100 Years...100 Heroes & Villains:
 Tim Strawn – Nominated Villain
 2004: AFI's 100 Years...100 Songs:
 "The Ballad of Cat Ballou" – Nominated
 2007: AFI's 100 Years...100 Movies (10th Anniversary Edition) – Nominated
 2008: AFI's 10 Top 10:
 #10 Western Film

Television pilots
Two separate television pilots were filmed. A 1970 pilot written and produced by Aaron Ruben featured Lesley Ann Warren as Cat, Jack Elam as Kid Shelleen and Tom Nardini repeating his role while a 1971 pilot starred Jo Ann Harris as Cat, Forrest Tucker as Kid Shelleen and Lee J. Casey as Jackson Two-Bears.

In popular culture
Cat Ballou is the favorite film of comedy directors Bobby and Peter Farrelly, as stated in The AFI 100 Years, 100 Laughs television special. The Balladeers from their film, There's Something About Mary, are inspired by similar characters in Cat Ballou.
Imagery from the hanging scene of Jane Fonda was spoofed advocating her execution for treason following her 1972 visit to Hanoi. A brief shot from that scene was used as part of Alex DeLarge's sadistic reverie in the movie A Clockwork Orange.
"Cat Ballou" is a card in the Spaghetti Western board game Bang!
In a 2014 interview on NPR, actor Bryan Cranston called Cat Ballou the "movie that had the most impact" on him when he was growing up.
Part of the opening animation of the Columbia logo featuring Jane Fonda was incorporated in the beginning of Spider-Man: Into the Spider-Verse (2018).
In episode 69 of the popular fiction podcast Welcome to Night Vale, Cecil Palmer mentions that he watched this movie with his boyfriend Carlos the Scientist repeatedly. Later episodes confirm that Cecil is a fan of the film, and episode 192, "It Doesn't Hold Up" features Cecil discussing the film.

See also
List of American films of 1965

References

External links
 
 
 
 
 

1960s historical comedy films
1965 musical comedy films
1960s Western (genre) comedy films
1965 films
American historical comedy films
American musical comedy films
American Western (genre) comedy films
Columbia Pictures films
1960s English-language films
Films scored by Frank De Vol
Films about capital punishment
Films directed by Elliot Silverstein
Films featuring a Best Actor Academy Award-winning performance
Films featuring a Best Musical or Comedy Actor Golden Globe winning performance
Films based on American novels
Films set in 1894
Films set in Wyoming
Films produced by Harold Hecht
Fratricide in fiction
1960s feminist films
Films with screenplays by Walter Newman (screenwriter)
Cultural depictions of Butch Cassidy and the Sundance Kid
1960s crime comedy films
1960s Western (genre) musical films
American Western (genre) musical films
1965 directorial debut films
1960s American films